Chubby Hubby or Aun Koh (born 1972) is a blogger from Singapore. His blog consists of dining reviews, travelling, wine and recipes for baking and cooking. It also consists of many photographs of the food, most being digitally altered. The blog earned reviews in the Guardian and was nominated for the world's best urban food blog in the 2005 Urban Blogging Awards.

Biography 
Koh graduated from Columbia College of Columbia University in 1996.

Koh was mentioned in Prime Minister Lee Hsien Loong's National Day Rally speech in 2006, as an example of Singaporean blogs on the internet. Singapore newspaper The Straits Times has mentioned him several times in articles about the hottest blogs, blogs to watch and the most popular food blogs. He was interviewed by Newsweek and mentioned in The New York Times, the South China Morning Post and The Guardian.

Koh was invited to dine during the finale recording of Bravo Channels 8th Season's Top Chef competition 2010; which was held in Singapore; the shows first international finale location. Koh was not a judge but was a dinner guest.

Personal life 
Koh's father is, Tommy Koh, Ambassador-At-Large for the Singapore Government who served as Singapore's Permanent representative to the United Nations and to the United States, as well as the third president of the United Nations Convention on the Law of the Sea.

Koh is married to Tan Su-Lyn, an editor.

References

External links
Official website

1972 births
Living people
Singaporean bloggers
Columbia College (New York) alumni